The women's heptathlon at the 2018 Commonwealth Games, as part of the athletics program, took place in the Carrara Stadium on 12 and 13 April 2018.

Records
Prior to this competition, the existing world and Games records were as follows:

Schedule
The schedule was as follows:

All times are Australian Eastern Standard Time (UTC+10)

Event results
Competitors contested a series of 7 events over two days, with their results being converted into points. The final standings were decided by their cumulative points tallies.

100 metres hurdles
Results after event 1 of 7:

High jump
Results after event 2 of 7:

Shot put
Results after event 3 of 7:

200 metres
Results after event 4 of 7:

Long jump
Results after event 5 of 7:

Javelin throw
Results after event 6 of 7:

800 metres
Results after event 7 of 7:

Standings
The highest mark recorded in each event is highlighted in yellow with a diamond symbol.

The final standings were as follows:

References

Women's heptathlon
2018
2018 in women's athletics